Strike First Freddy ( is a 1965 Danish spy comedy film directed by Erik Balling and starring Morten Grunwald as Frede. The film was released in US as "Operation Lovebirds". The film won the Bodil Award for Best Danish Film and Poul Bundgaard won the Bodil Award for Best Actor in a Supporting Role for his role as Kolick. It was followed by the sequel Relax Freddie in 1966.

Plot 
Freddy Hansen, a game salesman, is mistaken for a secret service agent on a ferry and suddenly finds himself in the middle of a dangerous game that could trigger another World War.

Cast 
 Morten Grunwald as Agent Frede Hansen
 Ove Sprogøe as Agent Smith
 Poul Bundgaard as Kolick
 Essy Persson as Sonja, a stripper
 Martin Hansen as Dr. Pax

References

External links 
 
 
 

1960s spy comedy films
1965 comedy films
1965 films
Best Danish Film Bodil Award winners
1960s Danish-language films
Films directed by Erik Balling
Films with screenplays by Erik Balling
Parody films based on James Bond films